Francis Suárez may refer to:

 Francis Suárez (footballer) (born 1987), Spanish football midfielder
 Francisco Suárez (1548–1617), sometimes called Francis, Spanish Jesuit priest, philosopher and theologian
 Francis X. Suarez, American politician and mayor of Miami